Nigon is a surname. Notable people with the surname include:

 Claude Nigon (1928–1994), French fencer
 Gabriel Nigon (born 1956), Swiss fencer
 Victor Nigon (1920–2015), French biologist

See also
 Nixon (surname)